Suresh Kumar is an Indian mountaineer. He was a member of two Indian Expeditions that conquered Mount Everest in 1992 and 1996. He is a native of Pattoli market Muthukulam, in Alappuzha district of Kerala State, India

Early life and career
He joined the Indo-Tibetan Border Police as a photographer in 1987 prior to which he working as a photographer at studios in Alappuzha. In 1997, he moved from Indo-Tibetan Border Police to the Special Protection Group (SPG), a special armed security force formed for the protection of Prime Minister of India and former Prime Ministers and their immediate family. He retired from Special Protection Group in 2008 after serving in the security forces of Prime Minister VP Singh, Chandra Shekhar, I. K. Gujral, Atal Bihari Vajpayee and Manmohan Singh. He is currently working as a Home Guard in Alappuzha city. In 1997, the Kerala government declared a cash award of ₹5 lakh, but he received only ₹1 lakh.

1991 Indo-Japan Kanchenjunga Expedition
Suresh Kumar was member in the expedition as the film team in the first Indo-Japanese Kanchenjunga expedition conducted by Indo-Tibetan Border Police to the world's third highest peak, Kanchenjunga led by Major Hukam Singh in 1991.

1992 Indo-Tibetan Border Police Expedition to Mount Everest 
The 1992 Indo-Tibetan Border Police Expedition to Mount Everest by Indo-Tibetan Border Police, led by Additional Deputy Supernatant Major Hukam Singh on 1992 recorded a total of 8 ascents by Indians including Ms.Santosh Yadav. The second woman summitter from India. Suresh Kumar was member in the expedition as the film team. Indo-Tibetan Border Police, of which senior medical officer Chittaranjan R. Pattanayak was the deputy leader. A total of 8 ascents by Indians.

1996 Indo-Tibetan Border Police expedition to Mount Everest
The second 1996 Indo-Tibetan Border Police expedition to Mount Everest led by Mohinder Singh -North Col-North East Ridge by the Indo-Tibetan Border Police to reach the summit of Mount Everest happened in the background of the 1996 Mount Everest disaster, and resulted in three summitters of the expedition dying. The expedition credited as being the first Indian ascent of Everest from the North Side and a total 8 persons reach on the summit. Indo-Tibetan Border Police, personnel Parash Mani Das and Harbhajan Singh were the deputy leaders. Suresh Kumar was a climbing member of this expedition but did not do the summit bid.

References 

Indian mountain climbers
Living people
Year of birth missing (living people)